Duplantis is a surname. Notable people with the surname include:

 Armand Duplantis (born 1999), American-born Swedish pole vaulter
 Jesse Duplantis (born 1949), American Evangelical Charismatic Christian minister
 Steve Duplantis (1972–2008), Canadian professional golf caddy

French toponymic surnames